Martha Craven Nussbaum (born May 6, 1947) is an American philosopher and the current Ernst Freund Distinguished Service Professor of Law and Ethics at the University of Chicago, where she is jointly appointed in the law school and the philosophy department. She has a particular interest in ancient Greek and Roman philosophy, political philosophy, existentialism, feminism, and ethics, including animal rights. She also holds associate appointments in classics, divinity, and political science, is a member of the Committee on Southern Asian Studies, and a board member of the Human Rights Program. She previously taught at Harvard and Brown.

Nussbaum has written more than two dozen books, including The Fragility of Goodness (1986), Cultivating Humanity: A Classical Defense of Reform in Liberal Education (1997), Sex and Social Justice (1998), Hiding from Humanity: Disgust, Shame, and the Law (2004), Frontiers of Justice: Disability, Nationality, Species Membership (2006), From Disgust to Humanity: Sexual Orientation and Constitutional Law (2010), and Justice for Animals: Our Collective Responsibility (2023). She received the 2016 Kyoto Prize in Arts and Philosophy, the 2018 Berggruen Prize, and the 2021 Holberg Prize.

Early life and education
Nussbaum was born as Martha Craven on May 6, 1947, in New York City, the daughter of George Craven, a Philadelphia lawyer, and Betty Warren, an interior designer and homemaker. During her teenage years, Nussbaum attended The Baldwin School in Bryn Mawr. She described her upbringing as "East Coast WASP elite ... very sterile, very preoccupied with money and status".  She would later credit her impatience with "mandarin philosophers" and dedication to public service as the "repudiation of my own aristocratic upbringing. I don't like anything that sets itself up as an in-group or an elite, whether it is the Bloomsbury group or Derrida".

After studying at Wellesley College for two years, dropping out to pursue theatre in New York, she studied theatre and classics at New York University, getting a Bachelor of Arts degree in 1969, and gradually moved to philosophy while at Harvard University, where she received a Master of Arts degree in 1972 and a Doctor of Philosophy degree in 1975, studying under G. E. L. Owen.

Career

In the 1970s and early 1980 she taught philosophy and classics at Harvard, where she was denied tenure by the Classics Department in 1982. Nussbaum then moved to Brown University, where she taught until 1994 when she joined the University of Chicago Law School faculty. Her 1986 book The Fragility of Goodness, on ancient Greek ethics and Greek tragedy, made her a well-known figure throughout the humanities. At Brown, Nussbaum's students included philosopher Linda Martín Alcoff and actor and playwright Tim Blake Nelson. In 1987, she gained public attention due to her critique of fellow philosopher Allan Bloom's The Closing of the American Mind.  More recent work (Frontiers of Justice) establishes Nussbaum as a theorist of global justice. Nussbaum's work on capabilities has often focused on the unequal freedoms and opportunities of women, and she has developed a distinctive type of feminism, drawing inspiration from the liberal tradition, but emphasizing that liberalism, at its best, entails radical rethinking of gender relations and relations within the family.

Nussbaum's other major area of philosophical work is the emotions.  She has defended a neo-Stoic account of emotions that holds that they are appraisals that ascribe to things and persons, outside the agent's own control, great significance for the person's own flourishing.  On this basis, she has proposed analyses of grief, compassion, and love, and, in a later book, of disgust and shame.

Nussbaum has engaged in many spirited debates with other intellectuals, in her academic writings as well as in the pages of semi-popular magazines and book reviews and, in one instance, when testifying as an expert witness in court. She testified in the Colorado bench trial for Romer v. Evans, arguing against the claim that the history of philosophy provides the state with a "compelling interest" in favor of a law denying gays and lesbians the right to seek passage of local non-discrimination laws. A portion of this testimony, dealing with the potential meanings of the term tolmêma in Plato's work, was the subject of controversy, and was called misleading and even perjurious by critics.

She responded to these charges in a lengthy article called "Platonic Love and Colorado Law". Nussbaum used multiple references from Plato's Symposium and his interactions with Socrates as evidence for her argument. The debate continued with a reply by one of her sternest critics, Robert P. George.  Nussbaum has criticized Noam Chomsky as being among the leftist intellectuals who hold the belief that "one should not criticize one's friends, that solidarity is more important than ethical correctness". She suggests that one can "trace this line to an old Marxist contempt for bourgeois ethics, but it is loathsome whatever its provenance".  Among her academic colleagues whose books she has reviewed critically are Allan Bloom, Harvey Mansfield, and Judith Butler.  Other academic debates have been with figures such as John Rawls, Richard Posner, and Susan Moller Okin. In January 2019, Nussbaum announced that she would be using a portion of her Berggruen Prize winnings to fund a series of roundtable discussions on controversial issues at the University of Chicago Law School. These discussions will be known as the Martha C. Nussbaum Student Roundtables.

Capabilities Approach 

Nussbaum is well known for her contributions in developing the Capabilities Approach to well-being, alongside Amartya Sen. The key question the Capabilities Approach asks is "What is each person able to do and to be?" As such, the approach looks at combined capabilities: an individual's developable abilities (internal abilities), freedom, and opportunity. Here, "freedom" refers to the ability of a person to choose one life or another, and opportunity refers to social, political, and/or economic conditions that allow or disallow deny individual growth.

Nussbaum asserts that all humans (and non-human animals) have a basic right to dignity. To provide human dignity, she states that governments must provide "at least a threshold level" of the following capabilities: life; bodily health; bodily integrity; senses, imagination, and thought, emotions; practical reason; affiliation; other species; play; and control over one's environment, including political and material environments.

Personal life
She was married to Alan Nussbaum from 1969 until they divorced in 1987, a period which also led to her conversion to Judaism and the birth of her daughter Rachel. Nussbaum's interest in Judaism has continued and deepened: on August 16, 2008, she became a bat mitzvah in a service at Temple K. A. M. Isaiah Israel in Chicago's Hyde Park, chanting from the Parashah Va-etchanan and the Haftarah Nahamu, and delivering a D'var Torah about the connection between genuine, non-narcissistic consolation and the pursuit of global justice. Nussbaum's daughter Rachel died in 2019 due to a drug-resistant infection following successful transplant surgery. At the time of her death she was a government affairs attorney in the Wildlife Division of Friends of Animals, a nonprofit organization working for animal welfare.  She and her mother co-authored four articles about wild animals.

Nussbaum dated and lived with Cass Sunstein for more than a decade. They had been engaged to be married. She had previously had a romantic relationship with Amartya Sen.

When she became the first woman to hold the Junior Fellowship at Harvard, Nussbaum received a congratulatory note from a "prestigious classicist" who suggested that since "female fellowess" was an awkward name, she should be called hetaira, for in Greece these educated courtesans were the only women who participated in philosophical symposia.

Major works

The Fragility of Goodness
The Fragility of Goodness: Luck and Ethics in Greek Tragedy and Philosophy confronts the ethical dilemma that individuals strongly committed to justice are nevertheless vulnerable to external factors that may deeply compromise or even negate their human flourishing. Discussing literary as well as philosophical texts, Nussbaum seeks to determine the extent to which reason may enable self-sufficiency. She eventually rejects the Platonic notion that human goodness can fully protect against peril, siding with the tragic playwrights and Aristotle in treating the acknowledgment of vulnerability as a key to realizing the human good.

Her interpretation of Plato's Symposium in particular drew considerable attention. Under Nussbaum's consciousness of vulnerability, the re-entrance of Alcibiades at the end of the dialogue undermines Diotima's account of the ladder of love in its ascent to the non-physical realm of the forms. Alcibiades's presence deflects attention back to physical beauty, sexual passions, and bodily limitations, hence highlighting human fragility.

Fragility brought attention to Nussbaum throughout the humanities. It garnered wide praise in academic reviews, and even drew acclaim in the popular media. Camille Paglia credited Fragility with matching "the highest academic standards" of the twentieth century, and The Times Higher Education called it "a supremely scholarly work". Nussbaum's reputation extended her influence beyond print and into television programs like PBS's Bill Moyers.

Cultivating Humanity
Cultivating Humanity: A Classical Defense of Reform in Liberal Education appeals to classical Greek texts as a basis for defense and reform of the liberal education. Noting the Greek cynic philosopher Diogenes' aspiration to transcend "local origins and group memberships" in favor of becoming "a citizen of the world", Nussbaum traces the development of this idea through the Stoics, Cicero, and eventually the classical liberalism of Adam Smith and Immanuel Kant. Nussbaum champions multiculturalism in the context of ethical universalism, defends scholarly inquiry into race, gender, and human sexuality, and further develops the role of literature as narrative imagination into ethical questions.

At the same time, Nussbaum also censured certain scholarly trends. She excoriated deconstructionist Jacques Derrida saying "on truth [he is] simply not worth studying for someone who has been studying Quine and Putnam and Davidson". She cites Zhang Longxi, who labels Derrida's analysis of Chinese culture "pernicious" and without "evidence of serious study". More broadly, Nussbaum criticized Michel Foucault for his "historical incompleteness [and] lack of conceptual clarity", but nevertheless singled him out for providing "the only truly important work to have entered philosophy under the banner of 'postmodernism.'  Nussbaum is even more critical of figures like Allan Bloom, Roger Kimball, and George Will for what she considers their "shaky" knowledge of non-Western cultures and inaccurate caricatures of today's humanities departments.

The New York Times praised Cultivating Humanity as "a passionate, closely argued defense of multiculturalism" and hailed it as "a formidable, perhaps definitive defense of diversity on American campuses". Nussbaum received the 2002 University of Louisville Grawemeyer Award in Education for Cultivating Humanity.

Sex and Social Justice
Sex and Social Justice argues that sex and sexuality are morally irrelevant distinctions that have been artificially enforced as sources of social hierarchy; thus, feminism and social justice have common concerns. Rejecting anti-universalist objections, Nussbaum proposes functional freedoms, or central human capabilities, as a rubric of social justice.

Nussbaum discusses at length the feminist critiques of liberalism itself, including the charge advanced by Alison Jaggar that liberalism demands ethical egoism. Nussbaum notes that liberalism emphasizes respect for others as individuals, and further argues that Jaggar has eluded the distinction between individualism and self-sufficiency. Nussbaum accepts Catharine MacKinnon's critique of abstract liberalism, assimilating the salience of history and context of group hierarchy and subordination, but concludes that this appeal is rooted in liberalism rather than a critique of it.

Nussbaum condemns the practice of female genital mutilation, citing deprivation of normative human functioning in its risks to health, impact on sexual functioning, violations of dignity, and conditions of non-autonomy. Emphasizing that female genital mutilation is carried out by brute force, its irreversibility, its non-consensual nature, and its links to customs of male domination, Nussbaum urges feminists to confront female genital mutilation as an issue of injustice.

Nussbaum also refines the concept of "objectification", as originally advanced by Catharine MacKinnon and Andrea Dworkin. Nussbaum defines the idea of treating as an object with seven qualities: instrumentality, denial of autonomy, inertness, fungibility, violability, ownership, and denial of subjectivity. Her characterization of pornography as a tool of objectification puts Nussbaum at odds with sex-positive feminism. At the same time, Nussbaum argues in support of the legalization of prostitution, a position she reiterated in a 2008 essay following the Spitzer scandal, writing: "The idea that we ought to penalize women with few choices by removing one of the ones they do have is grotesque."

Sex and Social Justice was highly praised by critics in the press. Salon declared: "She shows brilliantly how sex is used to deny some people—i.e., women and gay men—social justice." The New York Times praised the work as "elegantly written and carefully argued". Kathryn Trevenen praised Nussbaum's effort to shift feminist concerns toward interconnected transnational efforts, and for explicating a set of universal guidelines to structure an agenda of social justice.  Patrick Hopkins singled out for praise Nussbaum's "masterful" chapter on sexual objectification. Radical feminist Andrea Dworkin faulted Nussbaum for "consistent over-intellectualization of emotion, which has the inevitable consequence of mistaking suffering for cruelty".

Hiding from Humanity

Hiding from Humanity extends Nussbaum's work in moral psychology to probe the arguments for including two emotions—shame and disgust—as legitimate bases for legal judgments. Nussbaum argues that individuals tend to repudiate their bodily imperfection or animality through the projection of fears about contamination. This cognitive response is in itself irrational, because we cannot transcend the animality of our bodies. Noting how projective disgust has wrongly justified group subordination (mainly of women, Jews, and homosexuals), Nussbaum ultimately discards disgust as a reliable basis of judgment.

Turning to shame, Nussbaum argues that shame takes too broad a target, attempting to inculcate humiliation on a scope that is too intrusive and limiting on human freedom. Nussbaum sides with John Stuart Mill in narrowing legal concern to acts that cause a distinct and assignable harm.

In an interview with Reason magazine, Nussbaum elaborated:

Nussbaum's work was received with wide praise. The Boston Globe called her argument "characteristically lucid" and hailed her as "America's most prominent philosopher of public life". Her reviews in national newspapers and magazines garnered unanimous praise. In academic circles, Stefanie A. Lindquist of Vanderbilt University lauded Nussbaum's analysis as a "remarkably wide ranging and nuanced treatise on the interplay between emotions and law".

A prominent exception was Roger Kimball's review published in The New Criterion, in which he accused Nussbaum of "fabricating" the renewed prevalence of shame and disgust in public discussions and says she intends to "undermine the inherited moral wisdom of millennia". He rebukes her for "contempt for the opinions of ordinary people" and ultimately accuses Nussbaum herself of "hiding from humanity".

Nussbaum has recently drawn on and extended her work on disgust to produce a new analysis of the legal issues regarding sexual orientation and same-sex conduct.  Her book From Disgust to Humanity: Sexual Orientation and the Constitution was published by Oxford University Press in 2009, as part of their "Inalienable Rights" series, edited by Geoffrey Stone.

From Disgust to Humanity
In her 2010 book From Disgust to Humanity: Sexual Orientation and Constitutional Law, Nussbaum analyzes the role that disgust plays in law and public debate in the United States. The book primarily analyzes constitutional legal issues facing gay and lesbian Americans but also analyzes issues such as anti-miscegenation statutes, segregation, antisemitism and the caste system in India as part of its broader thesis regarding the "politics of disgust".

Nussbaum posits that the fundamental motivation of those advocating legal restrictions against gay and lesbian Americans is a "politics of disgust". These legal restrictions include blocking sexual orientation being protected under anti-discrimination laws (see Romer v. Evans), sodomy laws against consenting adults (See: Lawrence v. Texas), constitutional bans against same-sex marriage (See: California Proposition 8 (2008) ).  Nussbaum also argues that legal bans on conducts, such as nude dancing in private clubs, nudity on private beaches, the possession and consumption of alcohol in seclusion, gambling in seclusion or in a private club, which remain on the books, partake of the politics of disgust and should be overturned.

She identifies the "politics of disgust" closely with Lord Devlin and his famous opposition to the Wolfenden report, which recommended decriminalizing private consensual homosexual acts, on the basis that those things would "disgust the average man". To Devlin, the mere fact some people or act may produce popular emotional reactions of disgust provides an appropriate guide for legislating. She also identifies the 'wisdom of repugnance' as advocated by Leon Kass as another "politics of disgust" school of thought as it claims that disgust "in crucial cases ... repugnance is the emotional expression of deep wisdom, beyond reason's power fully to articulate it".

Nussbaum goes on to explicitly oppose the concept of a disgust-based morality as an appropriate guide for legislating. Nussbaum notes that popular disgust has been used throughout history as a justification for persecution. Drawing upon her earlier work on the relationship between disgust and shame, Nussbaum notes that at various times, racism, antisemitism, and sexism, have all been driven by popular revulsion.

In place of this "politics of disgust", Nussbaum argues for the harm principle from John Stuart Mill as the proper basis for limiting individual liberties. Nussbaum argues the harm principle, which supports the legal ideas of consent, the age of majority, and privacy, protects citizens while the "politics of disgust" is merely an unreliable emotional reaction with no inherent wisdom. Furthermore, Nussbaum argues this "politics of disgust" has denied and continues to deny citizens humanity and equality before the law on no rational grounds and causes palpable social harms to the groups affected.

From Disgust to Humanity earned acclaim from liberal American publications, and prompted interviews in The New York Times and other magazines.  One conservative magazine, The American Spectator, offered a dissenting view, writing: "[H]er account of the 'politics of disgust' lacks coherence, and 'the politics of humanity' betrays itself by not treating more sympathetically those opposed to the gay rights movement." The article also argues that the book is marred by factual errors and inconsistencies.

Creating Capabilities 
The book Creating Capabilities, first published in 2011, outlines a unique theory regarding the Capability approach or the Human development approach. Nussbaum draws on theories of other notable advocates of the Capability approach like Amartya Sen, but has a distinct approach. She proposes to choose a list of capabilities based on some aspects of John Rawls' concept of "central human capabilities." These ten capabilities encompass everything Nussbaum considers essential to living a life that one values.

Nussbaum's book combines ideas from the Capability approach, development economics, and distributive justice to substantiate a qualitative theory on capabilities. She criticizes existing economic indicators like GDP as failing to fully account for quality of life and assurance of basic needs, instead rewarding countries with large growth distributed highly unequally across the population. The book also aims to serve as an introduction to the Capability approach more generally; it is accessible to students and newcomers to the material because of the current lack of general knowledge about this approach. Finally, Nussbaum compares her approach with other popular approaches to human development and economic welfare, including Utilitarianism, Rawlsian Justice, and Welfarism in order to argue why the Capability approach should be prioritized by development economics policymakers.

Awards and honors

Honorary degrees and honorary societies
Nussbaum is a member of the American Academy of Arts and Sciences (1988) and the American Philosophical Society (1996). She is an Academician in the Academy of Finland (2000) and a Corresponding Fellow of the British Academy (2008). She has 64 honorary degrees from colleges and universities in North America, Latin America, Europe, Africa and Asia, including:

 Harvard University
 Carnegie Mellon University
 Dimitrie Cantemir Christian University, Romania
 Knox College
 Mount Holyoke College
 Wabash College
 Emory University
 Grinnell College
 Kenyon College
 Williams College
 Colgate University
 Bucknell University
 The College of William and Mary
 Lawrence University
 The University of St Andrews  (Scotland)
 The University of Edinburgh (Scotland)
 The Katholieke Universiteit Leuven (Belgium)
 The University of Toronto (Canada)
 The University for Humanistic Studies (Netherlands)
 The École Normale Supérieure (Paris, France)
 The New School University (New York City)
 The University of Haifa (Israel)
 The Ohio State University
 The University of North Carolina at Asheville
 Bielefeld University (Germany)
 Georgetown University (Washington, D.C.)
 The Institute of Social Studies (ISS) awarded its honorary doctorate to her in 2006
 Queen's University Belfast (Northern Ireland)
 Simon Fraser University (Canada)
 The University of the Free State (South Africa)
 Pontifical Catholic University of Peru
 University of Antioquia
 Concordia College Moorhead

Awards
 1990: Brandeis Creative Arts Award in Non-Fiction
 1991: PEN/Diamonstein-Spielvogel Award for the Art of the Essay for Love's Knowledge
 1998: Ness Book Award of the Association of American Colleges and Universities (Cultivating Humanity)
 2000: Book award of the North American Society for Social Philosophy (Sex and Social Justice)
 2002: University of Louisville Grawemeyer Award in Education (Cultivating Humanity)
 2003: Barnard College Medal of Distinction
 2004: Honorary membership into Phi Beta Kappa at the University of Chicago.
 2004: Association of American University Publishers Professional and Scholarly Book Award for Law (Hiding From Humanity)
 2005: listed among the world's Top 100 intellectuals by Foreign Policy (as well as in 2008 and 2010) and Prospect magazines.
 2007: Radcliffe Alumnae Recognition Award
 2009: American Philosophical Society's Henry M. Phillips Prize in Jurisprudence.
 2009: Arts and Sciences Advocacy Award from the Council of Colleges of Arts and Sciences (CCAS). CCAS bestows this award upon an individual or organization demonstrating exemplary advocacy for the arts and sciences, flowing from a deep commitment to the intrinsic worth of liberal arts education.
 2010: Centennial Medal of the Graduate School of Arts and Sciences, Harvard University
 2012: Prince of Asturias Awards for Social Sciences
 2014: John Locke Lectures at Oxford University.
 2015: Premio Nonino, Italy
 2015: Inamori Ethics Prize
 2016: Kyoto Prize in Philosophy, Japan
 2017: Jefferson Lecture
 2017: Don M. Randel Award for Contribution to the Humanities, American Academy of Arts and Sciences
 2018: Berggruen Prize
 2021: Holberg Prize "for her groundbreaking contribution to research in philosophy, law and related fields"
 2022: The Order of Lincoln the highest award for public service conferred by the State of Illinois
 2022: The Balzan Prize for "her transformative reconception of the goals of social justice, both globally and locally".

See also

References

External links

 University of Chicago biography
 Nussbaum on Anger and Forgiveness (Audio) University of Chicago
 Nussbaum's University of Chicago faculty website
 Nussbaum bibliographies
 
 
 Q&A with Martha Nussbaum from The Guardian
 'Creating capabilities' Nussbaum interviewed by Laurie Taylor on BBC Radio 4, July 2011
 
 In Depth interview with Nussbaum, June 6, 2010 on C-SPAN
 Martha Nussbaum, Land of my Dreams: Islamic liberalism under fire in India, Boston Review, March/April 2009. 
 Profile at the International Institute of Social Studies
 Honored as one of 50 Most Influential Living Philosophers
 "Dismantling the 'Citadels of Pride': Claudia Dreifus, an interview with Martha C. Nussbaum", The New York Review of Books (June 30, 2021)

1947 births
Living people
20th-century American non-fiction writers
20th-century American philosophers
20th-century American women writers
21st-century American non-fiction writers
21st-century American philosophers
21st-century American women writers
21st-century American writers
American animal rights scholars
American ethicists
American feminist writers
American scholars of ancient Greek philosophy
American social commentators
American women philosophers
Analytic philosophers
Aristotelian philosophers
Brown University faculty
Converts to Reform Judaism
Corresponding Fellows of the British Academy
Critics of postmodernism
Fellows of the American Academy of Arts and Sciences
Harvard Fellows
Harvard University alumni
Harvard University faculty
Jewish American academics
Jewish feminists
Jewish philosophers
Kyoto laureates in Arts and Philosophy
American LGBT rights activists
Members of the American Philosophical Society
Moral psychologists
New York University alumni
PEN/Diamonstein-Spielvogel Award winners
Philosophers of culture
Philosophers of education
Philosophers of history
Philosophers of mind
Philosophers of psychology
Philosophers of religion
Philosophers of sexuality
Political philosophers
Scientists from New York City
Social philosophers
The Baldwin School alumni
University of Chicago faculty
Virtue ethicists
Women classical scholars
Women religious writers
Writers about Hindu nationalism
Holberg Prize laureates